The Romanian Basketball Cup is an annual supercup game for Romanian basketball teams. The last winner was U-BT Cluj-Napoca in 2022.

. The game is played between the winners of the last Liga Națională and the National Cup.

Finals

References

Basketball competitions in Romania
Basketball supercup competitions in Europe